The Panar are a Muslim community found in the state of Gujarat in India.

History and origin

The word panar in the Gujarati language means a weaver, the traditional occupation of the community. They claim to have come from Central Asia and settled in the city of Patan, the historic capital of Gujarat. During the rule of Sultan Ahmad Shah, they spread all over north Gujarat, and are now found in Ahmedabad, Baroda, Mehsana, and Panchmahal. A section of the Panar are also found in the port city of Surat. They are a Gujarati speaking community, with many being bilingual in Urdu as well.

Present circumstances

The Panar are an endogamous community, practising both parallel cousin and cross cousin marriages. They are still essentially a community of weavers, particularly those of the town of Dholka in Ahmadabad District. In addition, the community were also involved in the manufacturing of cotton threads. They are a landless community, and with the decline in their traditional occupations, have become daily wage labourers.  Like other Gujarati Muslims, they have a caste association, the Panar Jamat, which acts as a community welfare association. The Panar are Sunni Muslims, and like other Muslim communities in the state, have been influenced by reformist sects, such as the Deobandi.

References

Social groups of Gujarat
Muslim communities of India
Muslim communities of Gujarat
Weaving communities of South Asia